The Rural Municipality of Whitewater is a former rural municipality (RM) in the Canadian province of Manitoba. It was originally incorporated as a rural municipality on December 22, 1883. It ceased on January 1, 2015 as a result of its provincially mandated amalgamation with the RM of Cameron and the Town of Hartney to form the Municipality of Grassland.

Communities 
 Elgin
 Fairfax
 Minto
 Regent
 Bunclody

References 

  Manitoba Historical Society - Manitoba Municipalities: Rural Municipality of Whitewater
 Map of Whitewater R.M. at Statcan

External links 
 Regional Municipality of Whitewater (archived July 19, 2014)

Former rural municipalities in Manitoba
Populated places disestablished in 2015
2015 disestablishments in Manitoba